Xenia Seeberg (born Anke Wesenberg; 4 April 1967) is a German film and television actress. She is perhaps best known for her role as Xev Bellringer in the science fiction television series Lexx. She also debuted as a singer in 1996 on the EMI Electrola label with her maxi single "Heartbeat". Several of her songs, including "Heartbeat", have appeared on compilations such as Dance Fever (1996), Dancemania 4 (1997) and Absolute Music 20 (1999).

From 2003 to 2011, she was married to actor Sven Martinek. They have one son Philip-Elias (born 2005). She is the lead singer of the band Vertikals.

In April 2005, Seeberg appeared on the cover of the German edition of Playboy.

She was ranked No. 84 on the Maxim Hot 100 Women of 2001.

She studied theater at the Lee Strasberg school.

Filmography
Mafia, Pizza, Razzia (1997, short film)
Knockin' on Heaven's Door (1997)
Geliebte Schwestern (1997, TV series, 4 episodes)
Lexx (1998–2002, TV series, 55 episodes)
Total Recall 2070 (1999, TV series) - episode 18 "Assessment"
Hellchild - The World of Nick Lyon  (anthology film, episode "Hilda Humphrey", 2002)
Beyond the Limits (2003)
Lord of the Undead (2004)
 (2005)
So, You've Downloaded a Demon (2007)
80 Minutes (2008)
Annihilation Earth (2009)
Tatort: Der Hammer (2014, TV series episode)

External links 
 
 Lexx fan site
 Xenia and The Vertikals

References

1972 births
Living people
People from Geldern
German film actresses
German television actresses
German female models
20th-century German actresses
21st-century German actresses
21st-century German women singers